Richard Dauenhauer (April 10, 1942 – August 19, 2014) was an American poet, linguist, and translator who married into, and subsequently became an expert on, the Tlingit nation of southeastern Alaska.  He was married to the Tlingit poet and scholar Nora Marks Dauenhauer. With his wife and Lydia T. Black, he won an American Book Award for Russians in Tlingit America: The Battles of Sitka, 1802 And 1804

Life
Dauenhauer was born in Syracuse, New York. His B.A. was from Syracuse University in Slavic Languages and his M.A. from the University of Texas at Austin in German. He earned his Ph.D. in Comparative Literature in 1975 from the University of Wisconsin–Madison, with a dissertation titled Text and Context of Tlingit Oral Tradition. He became a professor of literature at Alaska Methodist University in Anchorage, where he came in contact with the Tlingit people. In 1973 he married his second wife Nora, and became an honorary member of the Tlingit people.

From 1981 to 1988, he was the poet laureate of Alaska.
He worked as a program director at the Sealaska Heritage Foundation from 1983 to 1997, and with his wife edited the foundation's highly regarded Classics of Tlingit Oral Literature series. He also became a professor at the University of Alaska Southeast until retiring in 2011.

Dauenhauer "made recording, transcribing and advocating for the Tlingit language his life's work". He and his wife published histories of the Tlingit people and translations of their works, made recordings of spoken works in Tlingit, and helped standardize a written form for the language. They wrote an introductory textbook on the Tlingit language, and he brought what had previously been the oral traditions of the Tlingit into his poetry. As a professor, he also trained many others to teach and translate Tlingit. As a result of his efforts, Tlingit-language teaching is now available to many Alaskans from grade school through the college level.

His papers from 1961 to 1985 are held at University of Alaska Anchorage.

Dauenhauer died on August 19, 2014, in Juneau's Bartlett Regional Hospital, after having been diagnosed with pancreatic cancer a month prior.

Works
(with Philip Binham) (eds.) (1978) Snow in May: An Anthology of Finnish Writing 1945–1972. Madison, NJ: Fairleigh Dickinson University Press.
(1980) Glacier Bay Concerto. Anchorage: Alaska Pacific University Press.
 (1982) "Two Missions to Alaska."  Pacific Historian,, vol. 26, pp. 29–41.
(1986) Phenologies. Austin: Thorp Springs Press.
(1987) Frames of Reference. Haines, AK: Black Current Press.
 (1990) "Education in Russian Alaska."  In: Russian America: The Forgotten Frontier, ed. by Barbara Smith and Redmond J. Barnett, pp. 155–163.  Tacoma: Washington State Historical Society.
 (with Nora Marks Dauenhauer) "Beginning Tlingit", third edition.  Juneau, AK: Sealaska Heritage Foundation Press. (1991[1976])
 (with Nora Marks Dauenhauer) (eds.) (1981) "Because We Cherish You ...": Sealaska Elders Speak to the Future.  Juneau: Sealaska Heritage Foundation.
 (with Nora Marks Dauenhauer) (eds.) (1987) Haa Shuká, Our Ancestors: Tlingit Oral Narratives.    (Classics of Tlingit Oral Literature, vol. 1.)  Seattle: University of Washington Press.
 (with Nora Marks Dauenhauer) (eds.) (1990) Haa Tuwanáagu Yís, for Healing Our Spirit: Tlingit Oratory.    (Classics of Tlingit Oral Literature, vol. 2.)  Seattle: University of Washington Press.
 (with Nora Marks Dauenhauer) (eds.) (1994) Haa Ḵusteeyí, Our Culture: Tlingit Life Stories.  (Classics of Tlingit Oral Literature, vol. 3.)  Seattle: University of Washington Press.
 (with Nora Marks Dauenhauer) (1998) 'Technical, emotional and ideological issues in reversing language shift: examples from Southeast Alaska', in Grenoble, L A. & Whaley, L J. Endangered Languages: Language Loss and Community Response. Cambridge: Cambridge University Press

(2013) Benchmarks: New and Selected Poems 1963–2013. Fairbanks: University of Alaska Press.

References

1942 births
2014 deaths
American male poets
Deaths from cancer in Alaska
Deaths from pancreatic cancer
People from Juneau, Alaska
Writers from Syracuse, New York
Poets from Alaska
Poets from New York (state)
Poets Laureate of Alaska
Syracuse University alumni
University of Texas at Austin College of Liberal Arts alumni
University of Wisconsin–Madison alumni
Alaska Pacific University faculty
University of Alaska Southeast faculty
20th-century American poets
20th-century American translators
American Book Award winners
20th-century American male writers